Tawfiq Tayarah (born January 1, 1984, in Homs) is a Syrian football player who plays for Manshia Bani Hassan in the Jordan League.

He played for Al-Karamah in the 2008 AFC Champions League knockout stages.

References

1984 births
Living people
Syrian footballers
Al-Karamah players
Association football defenders
Sportspeople from Homs
Syrian expatriate footballers
Expatriate footballers in Jordan
Expatriate footballers in Oman
Syrian expatriate sportspeople in Oman
Syrian expatriate sportspeople in Jordan
Syrian Premier League players